The 1956–57 Yugoslav First League season was the 11th season of the First Federal League, the top level association football league of SFR Yugoslavia, since its establishment in 1946. Fourteen teams contested the competition, with Red Star winning their fourth title.

The season featured an unusually long four-month winter break — from 28 October 1956 until 3 March 1957 — during which the Yugoslav Olympic national team, which entirely consisted of players from the Yugoslav First League, participated at the 1956 Melbourne Olympics and won the silver medal.

Teams
At the end of the previous season Željezničar and Proleter Osijek were relegated from top level. They were replaced by Lokomotiva and Vardar.

League table

Results

Top scorers

See also
1956–57 Yugoslav Second League
1956–57 Yugoslav Cup

External links
Yugoslavia Domestic Football Full Tables

Yugoslav First League seasons
Yugo
1